Frédéric Oudéa (born 3 July 1963) is a French businessmann who currently serves as CEO of Société Générale and as president of the European Banking Federation.

Early life and education
Oudéa grew up in Paris. His father Paul was a respected medical professor but died when Frederic was 13. Oudéa reportedly became the man of the family, taking care of his two younger brothers. Though he originally planned to be a surgeon, as his fore-bearers were all doctors, he opted instead to attend the Lycee Louis-Le-Grand to study engineering. He then went to the École polytechnique, then to the École nationale d'administration. During his stint here, he took time to backpack through Canada, Nepal, and Burma, a trip he went on with Stéphane Richard.

Career

Career in the public sector
After his education at École polytechnique and École nationale d'administration in France, Oudéa worked in the economic sector of the French civil service from 1987 until 1995. His work at this time included working as Technical Adviser in the office of Nicolas Sarkozy, then Minister of Budget and Communication in 1993. He also worked in a number of other government offices including the audit department of the ministry of finance, the ministry of economy and finance, the budget ministry, and the cabinet of the ministry of treasury and communication. According to one report, the highlight of his career in the service was in 1993 his time with Sarkozy.

Career at Société Générale
Oudéa joined Société Générale in 1995 after being recruited by the then CEO Daniel Bouton and has worked in various positions within the bank since that time, in Paris and London. His first role was as deputy head of the bank's corporate banking division in London, where he later became head. In 1998, he was appointed to head the group's global supervisory arm and was in charge of development of the equities division. He then served as deputy CFO and CFO of the bank from 2002 until May 2008 when he took up his current position of CEO.

In November 2014, Oudéa was elected as the president of the European Banking Federation for a two-year term, effective 1 January 2015, succeeding Christian Clausen, president and CEO of Nordea Bank, who had served two years consecutively in the role.

During his first years in office, Oudéa came under pressure from investors and analysts due to the bank's poor performance. In 2019, the bank announced a cost reduction plan, which included cutting 1,600 jobs. That same year, Société Générale shareholders voted to give Oudéa another four-year term. In May 2022, Oudéa announced that he would not be seeking renewal after his term in office comes to an end in 2023.

Other activities

Corporate boards
 Sanofi, Non-Executive Chair of the Board of Directors (since 2022) 
 Capgemini, Independent Member of the Board of Directors (since 2018)

Non-profit organizations
 Institute of International Finance (IIF), Chairman of the Steering Committee on Regulatory Capital (since 2010)

References

1963 births
Living people
Businesspeople from Paris
French chief executives
French bankers
Lycée Louis-le-Grand alumni
École Polytechnique alumni
École nationale d'administration alumni
Chevaliers of the Légion d'honneur
Inspection générale des finances (France)